Athletico Mince is a British comedy podcast hosted by Bob Mortimer and Andy Dawson. The series began life as a humorous take on the world of football, including discussions such as whether being gentle in the Premier League makes one a better manager. As the podcast evolved however, the focus of the segments has switched more towards the bizarre, and often true, experiences and encounters of the hosts. Despite the move away from football, there are still a number of features that include personalities within the world of sport such as Steve McClaren, Mark Lawrenson and Peter Beardsley. Other features include Bob’s trips to South Africa, Dom Littlewood and Andy's interactions with Jeremy Corbyn.

The podcast was first released on 8 March 2016. In late 2016 a live version of the show was created and has since been toured around the UK, with a video available online. As of March 2018, the podcast had over 30 million listeners, with over 200,000 per episode.

Since April 2019, the podcast has used Patreon as a platform to introduce the 'Club Parsnips' membership. This allows the audience to pay for the content, if they wish. The benefits include bonus episodes, access to episodes earlier and no advertisements during episodes.

Sections and characters 
The podcasts include a number of real and fictional characters, voiced by both hosts, in semi-regular sections.
 Andy's Intro Sigh 
 Barry Homeowner (a character on which Mortimer based his incredibly popular 'Train Guy' Twitter sketches).
 Adrian Lewis and his visits to Slaughters, a restaurant staffed by the waiter, and Ron Craggs
 Dom Littlewood presents Fake or Legit / Who's the Prick? and The Dom Pod
 The Adventures of Mark Lawrenson and Robson Green
 Peter Beardsley and Mrs Beardsley
 An increasingly effeminate Steve McClaren and his best friend Casper the Snake
 Bob's South African Tales
 Gangs of the EPL
 Andy's run-ins with Jeremy Corbyn
 British Managers Lunch Club featuring Sam Allardyce, Tony Pulis, David Moyes, Alan Pardew, Nigel Pearson and more
 Bob's Wife's Questions / Questions from Andy's kids
 Memory Man
 Sights, Sounds or Songs of Sunderland
 Secret Soccer Superstar
 Kiss the Alderman
 Observational Comedy
 Vince Parsnips
 Scottish Tale
 The Guru
 Bananarama 
 Yes/No Behind the Door
 Lenny Biscuits
 The Landlord
 Mick McCarthy
 Roy Hodgson and his Warhammer obsession
 Martin Roberts visits footballers' homes
Nigel Pearson WAVs
 Crime Files (featuring Neil Hunt, Nonsense Potter)
 The Guru
Boing, Quack Quack, Oops, Peanuts, Thwack, Crunch, Give Me Just a Little More Time, Boing Boing, Oops, Wooah Yeah, etc. Quiz
Marlene/Free Sweeties Quiz
Sean Dyche’s motivational WAVs
 Talksport
Geordie Heat (featuring Sting, Sergeant Denise Welch and DCI Steve Bruce)
 John Omsk, Albanian trance music overlord

Other, less frequent, characters include Dara Ó Briain, Piers Morgan, Gregg Wallace, Alan Brazil, Ian Holloway, Chris Evans, Billy Bragg, Jim White, Joe Swash and Jordan Henderson.

In most cases, each section is self contained. However, on some occasions there have been crossovers within the stories, for example, the Alderman appearing at a Jeremy Corbyn rally and Peter Beardsley featuring in episodes of Gangs of the EPL.

Themes 
Each episode of Athletico Mince uses a traditional oriental folk music track for the intro and as a bridge between sections of the podcast. In the first episode Andy explains the music "is to send a message to our Far East listeners". As such, the theme music is an ongoing satirical jibe at Premier League clubs who portray themselves as "global" clubs in order to promote their brand in Asian markets.

As the show has progressed the focus and themes within the podcasts have evolved. While football began as the sole focus of the show, numerous other areas have become important areas of discussion.

Prior to the start of Athletico Mince, Bob underwent heart surgery that saved his life. A running joke in many of the episodes involves Bob questioning Andy as to why he hasn't bothered to ask about his health. With Andy living in Sunderland, and Bob having moved to the more affluent south of England from Middlesbrough, a lot of the humour is based on the social standing of the hosts with Dawson portrayed as a lower class, run-down character and Mortimer as a pompous millionaire who has servants and/or slaves.

Other media 
In April 2017 Dawson released The World of Football According to Athletico Mince.

Animated versions of the songs, themes and stories have been made available online and used during the live shows. Fan-made instrumental versions of the songs have been used in later episodes.

Certain performances of the 2020 live tour were postponed due to the COVID-19 outbreak.

The episode artwork for the first 50 episodes was illustrated by artist and designer Ben Brignell.

The chief animator for the podcast is graphic designer @benpics. His cartoon work and animation blends caricature and observation to add another dimension to the podcast.

Reception 
The podcast has received a largely positive response from both critics and fans with many enjoying its use of football as a theme, without listeners having to be avid followers of the sport. There has also been praise for Mortimer due to his performances without his comedy partner Vic Reeves, yet still in keeping with his surreal style. In an interview with Mortimer, Joe Zadeh from Vice quipped that the podcast "from episode one...derailed immediately from its intended topic of football, and has since become a bizarre and engrossing world of idle chat, improvised tales and sketches that often prolapse mid-joke".

Bruce Dessau from The London Evening Standard stated "This is distinctly daft comedy, full of in-jokes, catchphrases and occasional songs. It evokes Viz comic as much as comic Vic Reeves, yet Athletico Mince is very much a winner in its own right."

In The Guardian’s countdown of the 50 best podcasts of 2016, Gwilym Mumford named his favourite episode as "Steve’s Restaurant Showdown, which features a surreal Scottish folk tale from Mortimer that rivals anything he’s managed as part of Reeves and Mortimer."

References 

Sports podcasts
2016 podcast debuts
Football mass media in the United Kingdom
British podcasts